Saminsky Pogost is a rural locality (a village) in Saminskoye Rural Settlement, Vytegorsky District, Vologda Oblast, Russia. The population was 25 as of 2002.

Geography 
Kryukovskaya is the nearest rural locality.

References 

Rural localities in Vytegorsky District